Nakibou Aboubakari (born 10 March 1993) is a professional footballer who plays as a midfielder for Championnat National 2 club Fleury. Born in France, he plays for the Comoros national team.

Club career
Aboubakari was born in Saint Denis, France. He started his career with Guingamp but was released in 2013, having made one appearance for the first team in Ligue 2. He signed for Cypriot Second Division side Olympiakos Nicosia for the 2013–14 season.

In August 2014, he had an unsuccessful trial at Cypriot First Division side Apollon Limassol. On 17 October 2014, he signed for Stade Briochin.

After three seasons with Stade Briochin, he was tempted back to Guingamp, signing to play with the B team in Championnat National 3, but with the hope of returning to the professional group. The opportunity did not arise, and in June 2018 he returned to Stade Briochin.

Before the 2021–22 season, he moved to Sète. On 10 January 2022, he signed for Fleury in the Championnat National 2.

International career
Aboubakari made his debut for Comoros on 11 November 2011, coming on as a second-half substitute in the 2014 FIFA World Cup qualification – CAF First Round first leg against Mozambique.

References

External links

1993 births
Living people
Sportspeople from Saint-Denis, Seine-Saint-Denis
Association football midfielders
French footballers
Citizens of Comoros through descent
Comorian footballers
Comoros international footballers
French sportspeople of Comorian descent
En Avant Guingamp players
Olympiakos Nicosia players
Stade Briochin players
FC Sète 34 players
FC Fleury 91 players
Ligue 2 players
Cypriot Second Division players
Championnat National players
Championnat National 2 players
Championnat National 3 players
Comorian expatriate footballers
Expatriate footballers in Cyprus
Comorian expatriate sportspeople in Cyprus
2021 Africa Cup of Nations players
Footballers from Seine-Saint-Denis